Fred Burch is an American popular songwriter. Burch and fellow songwriter Don Hill also recorded as South, a 1969 single "Barefoot In The Woods" on the Silver Fox label. In 1983 he wrote a musical, American Passion, with Willie Fong Young.

Selected songs

 "Dream on Little Dreamer." - a hit for Perry Como in 1965
 "How High's the Watergate, Martha?"
 "PT-109"
 "Tragedy" Paul McCartney
 "He Made a Woman Out of Me" Bobbie Gentry/Bettie Lavette
 "Snakes Crawl at Night" Charley Pride
 "Tragedy" Brenda Lee
 "Sing You Children Sing" Elvis Presley
 "The Love Machine" Elvis Presley
 "Atlantic Coastal Line" Burl Ives
 "Strange" Patsy Cline

References

Living people
Year of birth missing (living people)
American male songwriters